The University of Alaska Southeast (UA Southeast, Alaska Southeast, or UAS) is a public university with its main campus in Juneau, Alaska and extended campuses in Sitka and Ketchikan. It is part of the University of Alaska System and was established on July 1, 1987, with the restructuring and consolidation of the former University of Alaska Juneau, Ketchikan Community College, and Islands Community College (Sitka). The university is accredited by the Northwest Commission on Colleges and Universities.

Campuses

Juneau 
The University of Alaska Southeast's main campus is located in Juneau. The majority of the campus lies between Auke Bay and Auke Lake. The campus consists of classrooms, studios, teaching and research labs, the Anderson Science building (North Pacific Marine Lab), the William A. Egan Library, housing, the Student Recreation Center (Charles Gamble Jr.-Donald Sperl Joint Use Facility), and office and administrative spaces. UAS also has a Technical Education Center, located in downtown Juneau, which consists of technical, construction and mechanical labs, a mine simulator, and classroom and office space. The Juneau campus offers Occupational Endorsements, Certificates, Associate, Baccalaureate, and Graduate degrees.

Sitka 
The Sitka campus was founded as Sitka Community College in 1962. The campus awards Occupational Endorsements in administrative office support, network support technician, web development, network administration, healthcare information technology, residential and light construction, law enforcement, and welding; Certificates in computer information and office systems, accounting technician, healthcare privacy and security, small business management, fisheries technology, pre-nursing and pre-radiologic technician qualifications, and health information management coding specialist; and associate degrees in health information management, general education, nursing (in partnership with the University of Alaska Anchorage), fisheries technology, apprenticeship technology, and health sciences.

Ketchikan 
The Ketchikan campus is the oldest campus in Southeast Alaska, and was originally established as Ketchikan Community College in 1954. Now a branch campus of the University of Alaska Southeast (UAS), the Ketchikan campus offers small class sizes, face-to-face classroom experiences, a large selection of online courses as well as blended face-to-face and online classroom experiences, and staff and advisors.  The Ketchikan campus is a leader in the State university system for online degree offerings including the only interdisciplinary Bachelor of Liberal Arts and Bachelor of Arts, Social Science.  Students can achieve degrees in education, business, public administration, health care including nursing, career education, social sciences, and liberal arts through local and online programs.
 
The Ketchikan campus also houses the Ketchikan Regional Maritime and Career Center, which is the only regional provider of U.S. Coast Guard-approved maritime industry training courses and programs. UAS Ketchikan is the only campus in the State of Alaska to offer an Associate of Applied Science in Marine Transportation. In addition to training mariners, the campus offers a U.S. Coast Guard-approved marine oiler (Qualified Member of the Engine Department) program, welding course work and a State of Alaska approved Certified Nurse Aide program.

UAS Ketchikan works closely with the Vigor Alaska Shipyard in Ketchikan and offers training opportunities for both shipyard incumbent workers and residents who want to work for Vigor Alaska.  The campus also works closely with the Alaska Marine Highway System, Southeast Alaska Pilots' Association and other maritime and maritime-related business and organization to meet the training needs of Southeast Alaska's employers.

Academics

Schools 
UAS has three academic schools:
the School of Arts and Sciences
the School of Career Education
the School of Education

Research partnerships 
UAS supports a wide array of collaborative research activities, including partnerships with the:
Alaska Coastal Rainforest Center
Alaska Experimental Program to Stimulate Competitive Research (EPSCoR)
Alaska Climate Science Center
Pacific Northwest Cooperative Ecosystem Studies Unit
Alaska Cooperative Ecosystem Studies Unit
UAS Spatial Ecosystem Analysis Lab (SEALAB)
University of Alaska Fairbanks School of Fisheries and Ocean Sciences

Libraries 
Juneau
William A. Egan Library
The William A. Egan Library develops physical and electronic collections in support of the programs and services provided by the University of Alaska Southeast to its diverse student body, the UAS community, and the residents of Juneau.  The library has an extensive collection of Pacific Northwest Coastal Art.
Sitka
Sitka students, faculty and staff receive library services from the UAS Egan Library in Juneau. Computer labs on campus facilitate access to online resources and reference assistance.
Ketchikan
The Ketchikan Campus Library is located on the second floor of the A.H. Ziegler Building at the upper campus on Seventh Avenue. The library contains approximately 36,000 volumes, 120 periodicals in print, and a collection of federal government documents. The library is a member of the First City Libraries Consortium .

Recreation center
The Student Recreation Center (Charles Gamble Jr.-Donald Sperl Joint Use Facility) is a shared facility with the Alaska Army National Guard (AANG). This facility includes basketball and volleyball courts, a suspended running/walking track, a thirty-foot climbing wall, a weight training room, and a dance and cardio studio. The Student Recreation Center opened in September 2005 and replaced the older Student Activities Center.

Athletics 
UAS has an array of intramural sports and activities. UAS did have an intercollegiate sports program that was shut down along with Sheldon Jackson College and Alaska Pacific University in 1990. Even though the focus of a school is its education, former Director of Activities at UAS Tish Griffin said students need activities like basketball. When the three smaller Alaska colleges (UAS, APU and Sheldon Jackson) all shut down their sports programs in 1990, it had a huge effect on the UAS campus. The following year, all three schools saw a drop in enrollment. "There was an impact," Griffin said. "I saw the most impact on student life. What was missing was the school spirit, the common athletic event that united the campus. You have to have a way for the students to recreate. Activities give them a fuller life, and they're much more rounded. And it also helps them buy into the campus."

Publications
The student newspaper of UAS is The Whalesong. The student literary magazine is Tidal Echoes. The newspaper was founded in 1981 and has a circulation of 1,000. An academic journal titled "Summit" is published annually through the student Writing Center.

Notable students 
 R. T. Wallen, Internationally known Alaskan Artist, received an Honorary Doctorate in 2006 and sculpted the Humpback Whale seen on the campus grounds

References

External links 
 

 
Southeast
Southeast
Buildings and structures in Juneau, Alaska
Buildings and structures in Ketchikan Gateway Borough, Alaska
Buildings and structures in Sitka, Alaska
Educational institutions established in 1972
Universities and colleges accredited by the Northwest Commission on Colleges and Universities
Education in Juneau, Alaska
Education in Ketchikan Gateway Borough, Alaska
Education in Sitka, Alaska
1972 establishments in Alaska